The Etchmiadzin uezd was a county (uezd) of the Erivan Governorate of the Caucasus Viceroyalty of the Russian Empire. The uezd bordered the Alexandropol uezd to the north, the Nor Bayazet uezd to the east, Erivan uezd to the north, the Surmalu uezd to the south, and the Kars Oblast to the west. It included all of the Armavir Province and most of the Aragatsotn Province of present-day Armenia. The administrative centre of the county was Vagorshapat (Vagharshapat), also referred to as Etchmiadzin—the administrative capital of the Armenian Apostolic Church.

Administrative divisions 
The subcounties (uchastoks) of the Etchmiadzin uezd in 1913 were as follows:

Demographics

Russian Empire Census 
The majority of the population indicated Armenian to be their mother tongue, with significant Tatar and Kurdish speaking minorities.

Kavkazskiy kalendar 
The statistics indicated an overwhelmingly Armenian population with sizeable Shia Muslim and Kurdish minorities:

Notes

References

Bibliography 

Vagharshapat
Aragatsotn Province
Armavir Province
Uezds of Erivan Governorate